Nylon is a generic designation for a family of synthetic polymers composed of polyamides (repeating units linked by amide links). 
Nylon is a silk-like thermoplastic, generally made from petroleum,
that can be melt-processed into fibers, films, or shapes. 
Nylon polymers can be mixed with a wide variety of additives to achieve many property variations.
Nylon polymers have found significant commercial applications in fabric and fibers (apparel, flooring and rubber reinforcement), in shapes (molded parts for cars, electrical equipment, etc.), and in films (mostly for food packaging).

History

DuPont and the invention of nylon 
Researchers at DuPont began developing cellulose based fibers, culminating in the synthetic fiber rayon. DuPont's experience with rayon was an important precursor to its development and marketing of nylon.

DuPont's invention of nylon spanned an eleven-year period, ranging from the initial research program in polymers in 1927 to its announcement in 1938, shortly before the opening of the 1939 New York World's Fair. The project grew from a new organizational structure at DuPont, suggested by Charles Stine in 1927, in which the chemical department would be composed of several small research teams that would focus on "pioneering research" in chemistry and would "lead to practical applications". Harvard instructor Wallace Hume Carothers was hired to direct the polymer research group. Initially he was allowed to focus on pure research, building on and testing the theories of German chemist Hermann Staudinger. He was very successful, as research he undertook greatly improved the knowledge of polymers and contributed to science.

Nylon was the first commercially successful synthetic thermoplastic polymer. DuPont began its research project in 1927.
The first nylon, nylon 66, was synthesized on February 28, 1935, by Wallace Hume Carothers at DuPont's research facility at the DuPont Experimental Station.  In response to Carothers' work, Paul Schlack at IG Farben developed nylon 6, a different molecule based on caprolactam, on January 29, 1938.

Nylon was first used commercially in a nylon-bristled toothbrush in 1938, followed more famously in women's stockings or "nylons" which were shown at the 1939 New York World's Fair and first sold commercially in 1940, whereupon they became an instant commercial success with 64 million pairs sold during their first year on the market.  During World War II, almost all nylon production was diverted to the military for use in parachutes and parachute cord. Wartime uses of nylon and other plastics greatly increased the market for the new materials.

In the spring of 1930, Carothers and his team had already synthesized two new polymers. One was neoprene, a synthetic rubber greatly used during World War II. The other was a white elastic but strong paste that would later become nylon. After these discoveries, Carothers' team was made to shift its research from a more pure research approach investigating general polymerization to a more practically focused goal of finding "one chemical combination that would lend itself to industrial applications".

It was not until the beginning of 1935 that a polymer called "polymer 6-6" was finally produced. Carothers' coworker, Washington University alumnus Julian W. Hill had used a cold drawing method to produce a polyester in 1930. This cold drawing method was later used by Carothers in 1935 to fully develop nylon. The first example of nylon (nylon 6.6) was produced on February 28, 1935, at DuPont's research facility at the DuPont Experimental Station. It had all the desired properties of elasticity and strength.
However, it also required a complex manufacturing process that would become the basis of industrial production in the future. DuPont obtained a patent for the polymer in September 1938, and quickly achieved a monopoly of the fiber. Carothers died 16 months before the announcement of nylon, therefore he was never able to see his success.

The production of nylon required interdepartmental collaboration between three departments at DuPont: the Department of Chemical Research, the Ammonia Department, and the Department of Rayon. Some of the key ingredients of nylon had to be produced using high pressure chemistry, the main area of expertise of the Ammonia Department. Nylon was considered a "godsend to the Ammonia Department", which had been in financial difficulties. The reactants of nylon soon constituted half of the Ammonia Department's sales and helped them come out of the period of the Great Depression by creating jobs and revenue at DuPont.

DuPont's nylon project demonstrated the importance of chemical engineering in industry, helped create jobs, and furthered the advancement of chemical engineering techniques.  In fact, it developed a chemical plant that provided 1800 jobs and used the latest technologies of the time, which are still used as a model for chemical plants today. The ability to acquire a large number of chemists and engineers quickly was a huge contribution to the success of DuPont's nylon project.  The first nylon plant was located at Seaford, Delaware, beginning commercial production on December 15, 1939.  On October 26, 1995, the Seaford plant was designated a National Historic Chemical Landmark by the American Chemical Society.

Early marketing strategies 
An important part of nylon's popularity stems from DuPont's marketing strategy. DuPont promoted the fiber to increase demand before the product was available to the general market.  Nylon's commercial announcement occurred on October 27, 1938, at the final session of the Herald Tribunes yearly "Forum on Current Problems", on the site of the approaching New York City world's fair. The "first man-made organic textile fiber" which was derived from "coal, water and air" and promised to be "as strong as steel, as fine as the spider's web" was received enthusiastically by the audience, many of them middle-class women, and made the headlines of most newspapers. Nylon was introduced as part of "The world of tomorrow" at the 1939 New York World's Fair and was featured at DuPont's "Wonder World of Chemistry" at the Golden Gate International Exposition in San Francisco in 1939. Actual nylon stockings were not shipped to selected stores in the national market until May 15, 1940. However, a limited number were released for sale in Delaware before that. The first public sale of nylon stockings occurred on October 24, 1939, in Wilmington, Delaware. 4,000 pairs of stockings were available, all of which were sold within three hours.

Another added bonus to the campaign was that it meant reducing silk imports from Japan, an argument that won over many wary customers. Nylon was even mentioned by President Roosevelt's cabinet, which addressed its "vast and interesting economic possibilities" five days after the material was formally announced.

However, the early excitement over nylon also caused problems.  It fueled unreasonable expectations that nylon would be better than silk, a miracle fabric as strong as steel that would last forever and never run. Realizing the danger of claims such as "New Hosiery Held Strong as Steel" and "No More Runs", DuPont scaled back the terms of the original announcement, especially those stating that nylon would possess the strength of steel.

Also, DuPont executives marketing nylon as a revolutionary man-made material did not at first realize that some consumers experienced a sense of unease and distrust, even fear, towards synthetic fabrics. A particularly damaging news story, drawing on DuPont's 1938 patent for the new polymer, suggested that one method of producing nylon might be to use cadaverine (pentamethylenediamine), a chemical extracted from corpses.  Although scientists asserted that cadaverine was also extracted by heating coal, the public often refused to listen. A woman confronted one of the lead scientists at DuPont and refused to accept that the rumour was not true.

DuPont changed its campaign strategy, emphasizing that nylon was made from "coal, air and water", and started focusing on the personal and aesthetic aspects of nylon, rather than its intrinsic qualities. Nylon was thus domesticated, and attention shifted to the material and consumer aspect of the fiber with slogans like "If it's nylon, it's prettier, and oh! How fast it dries!".

Production of nylon fabric 

After nylon's nationwide release in 1940, production was increased. 1300 tons of the fabric were produced during 1940.  During their first year on the market, 64 million pairs of nylon stockings were sold. In 1941, a second plant was opened in Martinsville, Virginia, due to the success of the fabric.

While nylon was marketed as the durable and indestructible material of the people, it was sold at almost twice the price of silk stockings ($4.27 per pound of nylon versus $2.79 per pound of silk). Sales of nylon stockings were strong in part due to changes in women's fashion. As Lauren Olds explains: "by 1939 [hemlines] had inched back up to the knee, closing the decade just as it started off". The shorter skirts were accompanied by a demand for stockings that offered fuller coverage without the use of garters to hold them up.

However, as of February 11, 1942, nylon production was redirected from being a consumer material to one used by the military. DuPont's production of nylon stockings and other lingerie stopped, and most manufactured nylon was used to make parachutes and tents for World War II. Although nylon stockings already made before the war could be purchased, they were generally sold on the black market for as high as $20.

Once the war ended, the return of nylon was awaited with great anticipation. Although DuPont projected yearly production of 360 million pairs of stockings, there were delays in converting back to consumer rather than wartime production. In 1946, the demand for nylon stockings could not be satisfied, which led to the Nylon riots.  In one instance, an estimated 40,000 people lined up in Pittsburgh to buy 13,000 pairs of nylons. In the meantime, women cut up nylon tents and parachutes left from the war in order to make blouses and wedding dresses. Between the end of the war and 1952, production of stockings and lingerie used 80% of the world's nylon. DuPont put focus on catering to the civilian demand, and continually expanded its production.

Introduction of nylon blends 
As pure nylon hosiery was sold in a wider market, problems became apparent. Nylon stockings were found to be fragile, in the sense that the thread often tended to unravel lengthwise, creating 'runs'.  People also reported that pure nylon textiles could be uncomfortable due to nylon's lack of absorbency.  Moisture stayed inside the fabric near the skin under hot or moist conditions instead of being "wicked" away. Nylon fabric could also be itchy, and tended to cling and sometimes spark as a result of static electrical charge built up by friction.
Also, under some conditions, stockings could decompose turning back into nylon's original components of air, coal, and water. Scientists explained this as a result of air pollution, attributing it to London smog in 1952, as well as poor air quality in New York and Los Angeles.

The solution found to problems with pure nylon fabric was to blend nylon with other existing fibers or polymers such as cotton, polyester, and spandex.  This led to the development of a wide array of blended fabrics. The new nylon blends retained the desirable properties of nylon (elasticity, durability, ability to be dyed) and kept clothes prices low and affordable.
As of 1950, the New York Quartermaster Procurement Agency (NYQMPA), which developed and tested textiles for the Army and Navy, had committed to developing a wool-nylon blend. They were not the only ones to introduce blends of both natural and synthetic fibers. America's Textile Reporter referred to 1951 as the "Year of the blending of the fibers". Fabric blends included mixes like "Bunara" (wool-rabbit-nylon) and "Casmet" (wool-nylon-fur).  In Britain, in November 1951, the inaugural address of the 198th session of the Royal Society for the Encouragement of Arts, Manufactures and Commerce focused on the blending of textiles.

DuPont's Fabric Development Department cleverly targeted French fashion designers, supplying them with fabric samples. In 1955, designers such as Coco Chanel, Jean Patou, and Christian Dior showed gowns created with DuPont fibers, and fashion photographer Horst P. Horst was hired to document their use of DuPont fabrics. American Fabrics credited blends with providing "creative possibilities and new ideas for fashions which had been hitherto undreamed of."

Etymology
DuPont went through an extensive process to generate names for its new product. 
In 1940, John W. Eckelberry of DuPont stated that the letters "nyl" were arbitrary, and the "on" was copied from the suffixes of other fibers such as cotton and rayon. A later publication by DuPont (Context, vol. 7, no. 2, 1978) explained that the name was originally intended to be "No-Run" ("run" meaning "unravel"), but was modified to avoid making such an unjustified claim. Since the products were not really run-proof, the vowels were swapped to produce "nuron", which was changed to "nilon" "to make it sound less like a nerve tonic". For clarity in pronunciation, the "i" was changed to "y".

A persistent urban legend exists that the name is derived from "New York" and "London"; however, no organisation in London was ever involved in the research and production of nylon.

Longer-term popularity 
In spite of oil shortages in the 1970s, consumption of nylon textiles continued to grow by 7.5% per year between the 1960s and 1980s. 
Overall production of synthetic fibers, however, dropped from 63% of the worlds textile production in 1965, to 45% of the world's textile production in early 1970s. The appeal of "new" technologies wore off, and nylon fabric "was going out of style in the 1970s". Also, consumers became concerned about environmental costs throughout the production cycle: obtaining the raw materials (oil), energy use during production, waste produced during creation of the fiber, and eventual waste disposal of materials that were not biodegradable. 
Synthetic fibers have not dominated the market since the 1950s and 1960s. , the worldwide production of nylon is estimated at 8.9 million tons. As one of the largest engineering polymer families, the global demand of nylon resins and compounds was valued at roughly US$20.5 billion in 2013. The market is expected to reach US$30 billion by 2020 by following an average annual growth of 5.5%.

Although pure nylon has many flaws and is now rarely used, its derivatives have greatly influenced and contributed to society. From scientific discoveries relating to the production of plastics and polymerization, to economic impact during the depression and the changing of women's fashion, nylon was a revolutionary product. The Lunar Flag Assembly, the first flag planted on the moon in a symbolic gesture of celebration, was made of nylon. The flag itself cost $5.50, but had to have a specially designed flagpole with a horizontal bar so that it would appear to "fly".
One historian describes nylon as "an object of desire", comparing the invention to Coca-Cola in the eyes of 20th century consumers.

Chemistry

Nomenclature 
In common usage, the prefix "PA" (polyamide) or the name "Nylon" are used interchangeably and are equivalent in meaning.

The nomenclature used for nylon polymers was devised during the synthesis of the first simple aliphatic nylons and uses numbers to describe the number of carbons in each monomer unit, including the carbon(s) of the carboxylic acid(s). Subsequent use of cyclic and aromatic monomers required the use of letters or sets of letters. One number after "PA" or "Nylon" indicates a homopolymer which is monadic or based on one amino acid (minus H2O) as monomer:

 PA 6 or Nylon 6: [NH−(CH2)5−CO]n made from ε-caprolactam.

Two numbers or sets of letters indicate a dyadic homopolymer formed from two monomers: one diamine and one dicarboxylic acid. The first number indicates the number of carbons in the diamine. The two numbers should be separated by a comma for clarity, but the comma is often omitted.

 PA or Nylon 6,10 (or 610): [NH−(CH2)6−NH−CO−(CH2)8−CO]n made from hexamethylenediamine and sebacic acid;

For copolymers the comonomers or pairs of comonomers are separated by slashes:

 PA 6/66: [NH−(CH2)6−NH−CO−(CH2)4−CO]n−[NH−(CH2)5−CO]m made from caprolactam, hexamethylenediamine and adipic acid;
 PA 66/610: [NH−(CH2)6−NH−CO−(CH2)4−CO]n−[NH−(CH2)6−NH−CO−(CH2)8−CO]m made from hexamethylenediamine, adipic acid and sebacic acid.

The term polyphthalamide (abbreviated to PPA) is used when 60% or more moles of the carboxylic acid portion of the repeating unit in the polymer chain is composed of a combination of terephthalic acid (TPA) and isophthalic acid (IPA).

Types of nylon

Nylon 66 and related heteropolymers

Nylon 66 and related polyamides are condensation polymers forms from equal parts of diamine and dicarboxylic acids.  In the first case, the "repeating unit" has the ABAB structure, as also seen in many polyesters and polyurethanes. Since each monomer in this copolymer has the same reactive group on both ends, the direction of the amide bond reverses between each monomer, unlike natural polyamide proteins, which have overall directionality: C terminal → N terminal. In the second case (so called AA), the repeating unit corresponds to the single monomer.

Wallace Carothers at DuPont patented nylon 66 using amides. 
In the case of nylons that involve reaction of a diamine and a dicarboxylic acid, it is difficult to get the proportions exactly correct, and deviations can lead to chain termination at molecular weights less than a desirable 10,000 daltons (u). To overcome this problem, a crystalline, solid "nylon salt" can be formed at room temperature, using an exact 1:1 ratio of the acid and the base to neutralize each other. The salt is crystallized to purify it and obtain the desired precise stoichiometry.  Heated to 285 °C (545 °F), the salt reacts to form nylon polymer with the production of water.

Nylon 510, made from pentamethylene diamine and sebacic acid, was included in the Carothers patent to nylon 66  Nylon 610 is produced similarly using hexamethylene diamine.These materials are more expensive because of the relatively high cost of sebacic acid.  Owing to the high hydrocarbon content, nylon 610 is more hydrophobic and finds applications suited for this property, such as bristles.

Examples of these polymers that are or were commercially available
 PA46 DSM Stanyl
 PA410 DSM Ecopaxx
 PA4T DSM Four Tii
 PA66 DuPont Zytel

Nylon 6 and related homopolymers

Thse polymers are made from a lactam or amino acid. The synthetic route using lactams (cyclic amides) was developed by Paul Schlack at IG Farben, leading to nylon 6, or polycaprolactam—formed by a ring-opening polymerization. The peptide bond within the caprolactam is broken with the exposed active groups on each side being incorporated into two new bonds as the monomer becomes part of the polymer backbone.

The 428 °F (220 °C) melting point of nylon 6 is lower than the 509 °F (265 °C) melting point of nylon 66.
Homopolymer nylons are derived from one monomer

Examples of these polymers that are or were commercially available
 PA6 Lanxess Durethan B
 PA11 Arkema Rilsan
 PA12 Evonik Vestamid L

Nylon 1,6 

Nylons can also be synthesized from dinitriles using acid catalysis. For example, this method is applicable for preparation of nylon 1,6 from adiponitrile, formaldehyde and water. Additionally, nylons can be synthesized from diols and dinitriles using this method as well.

Copolymers 
It is easy to make mixtures of the monomers or sets of monomers used to make nylons to obtain copolymers. This lowers crystallinity and can therefore lower the melting point.

Some copolymers that have been or are commercially available are listed below: 
 PA6/66 DuPont Zytel
 PA6/6T BASF Ultramid T (6/6T copolymer)
 PA6I/6T DuPont Selar PA
 PA66/6T DuPont Zytel HTN
 PA12/MACMI EMS Grilamid TR

Blends 
Most nylon polymers are miscible with each other allowing a range of blends to be made.  The two polymers can react with one another by transamidation to form random copolymers.

According to their crystallinity, polyamides can be:
 semi-crystalline: 
 high crystallinity: PA46 and PA66;
 low crystallinity: PAMXD6 made from m-xylylenediamine and adipic acid;
 amorphous: PA6I made from hexamethylenediamine and isophthalic acid.

According to this classification, PA66, for example, is an aliphatic semi-crystalline homopolyamide.

Environmental effect, incineration, and recycling 
All nylons are susceptible to hydrolysis, especially by strong acids, a reaction essentially the reverse of their synthesis. The molecular weight of nylon products so attacked drops, and cracks form quickly at the affected zones. Lower members of the nylons (such as nylon 6) are affected more than higher members such as nylon 12. This means that nylon parts cannot be used in contact with sulfuric acid for example, such as the electrolyte used in lead–acid batteries.

When being molded, nylon must be dried to prevent hydrolysis in the molding machine barrel since water at high temperatures can also degrade the polymer. The reaction is of the type:

The average greenhouse gas footprint of nylon in manufacturing carpets is estimated at 5.43 kg CO2 equivalent per kg, when produced in Europe. This gives it almost the same carbon footprint as wool, but with greater durability and therefore a lower overall carbon footprint.

Data published by PlasticsEurope indicates for nylon 66 a greenhouse gas footprint of 6.4 kg CO2 equivalent per kg, and an energy consumption of 138 kJ/kg.  When considering the environmental impact of nylon, it is important to consider the use phase.

Various nylons break down in fire and form hazardous smoke, and toxic fumes or ash, typically containing hydrogen cyanide. Incinerating nylons to recover the high energy used to create them is usually expensive, so most nylons reach the garbage dumps, decaying slowly. Discarded nylon fabric takes 30–40 years to decompose. Nylon used in discarded fishing gear such as fishing nets is a contributor to debris in the ocean. Nylon is a robust polymer and lends itself well to recycling.  Much nylon resin is recycled directly in a closed loop at the injection molding machine, by grinding sprues and runners and mixing them with the virgin granules being consumed by the molding machine.

Because of the expense and difficulties of the nylon recycling process, few companies utilize it while most favor using cheaper, newly-made plastics for their products instead. US clothing company Patagonia has products containing recycled nylon and in the mid-2010s invested in Bureo, a company that recycles nylon from used fishing nets to use in sunglasses and skateboards. The Italian company Aquafil also has demonstrated recycling fishing nets lost in the ocean into apparel. Vanden Recycling recycles nylon and other polyamides (PA) and has operations in the UK, Australia, Hong Kong, the UAE, Turkey and Finland.

Nylon is the most popular fiber type in the residential carpet industry today. The US EPA estimates that 9.2% of carpet fiber, backing and padding was recycled in 2018, 17.8% was incinerated in waste-to-energy facilities, and 73% was discarded in landfills. Some of the world's largest carpet and rug companies are promoting "cradle to cradle"—the re-use of non-virgin materials including ones not historically recycled—as the industry's pathway forward.

Bulk properties 
Above their melting temperatures, Tm, thermoplastics like nylon are amorphous solids or viscous fluids in which the chains approximate random coils. Below Tm, amorphous regions alternate with regions which are lamellar crystals. The amorphous regions contribute elasticity and the crystalline regions contribute strength and rigidity. The planar amide (-CO-NH-) groups are very polar, so nylon forms multiple hydrogen bonds among adjacent strands. Because the nylon backbone is so regular and symmetrical, especially if all the amide bonds are in the trans configuration, nylons often have high crystallinity and make excellent fibers. The amount of crystallinity depends on the details of formation, as well as on the kind of nylon.

Nylon 66 can have multiple parallel strands aligned with their neighboring peptide bonds at coordinated separations of exactly six and four carbons for considerable lengths, so the carbonyl oxygens and amide hydrogens can line up to form interchain hydrogen bonds repeatedly, without interruption (see the figure opposite). Nylon 510 can have coordinated runs of five and eight carbons. Thus parallel (but not antiparallel) strands can participate in extended, unbroken, multi-chain β-pleated sheets, a strong and tough supermolecular structure similar to that found in natural silk fibroin and the β-keratins in feathers. (Proteins have only an amino acid α-carbon separating sequential -CO-NH- groups.) Nylon 6 will form uninterrupted H-bonded sheets with mixed directionalities, but the β-sheet wrinkling is somewhat different. The three-dimensional disposition of each alkane hydrocarbon chain depends on rotations about the 109.47° tetrahedral bonds of singly bonded carbon atoms.

When extruded into fibers through pores in an industry spinneret, the individual polymer chains tend to align because of viscous flow. If subjected to cold drawing afterwards, the fibers align further, increasing their crystallinity, and the material acquires additional tensile strength. In practice, nylon fibers are most often drawn using heated rolls at high speeds.

Block nylon tends to be less crystalline, except near the surfaces due to shearing stresses during formation. Nylon is clear and colorless, or milky, but is easily dyed. Multistranded nylon cord and rope is slippery and tends to unravel. The ends can be melted and fused with a heat source such as a flame or electrode to prevent this.

Nylons are hygroscopic, and will absorb or desorb moisture as a function of the ambient humidity. Variations in moisture content have several effects on the polymer.  Firstly, the dimensions will change, but more importantly moisture acts as a plasticizer, lowering the glass transition temperature (Tg), and consequently the elastic modulus at temperatures below the Tg

When dry, polyamide is a good electrical insulator. However, polyamide is hygroscopic. The absorption of water will change some of the material's properties such as its electrical resistance. Nylon is less absorbent than wool or cotton.

Characteristics 

The characteristic features of nylon 6,6 include:
 Pleats and creases can be heat-set at higher temperatures
 More compact molecular structure
 Better weathering properties; better sunlight resistance
 Softer "Hand"
 High melting point (256 °C, 492.8 °F)
 Superior colorfastness
 Excellent abrasion resistance

On the other hand, nylon 6 is easy to dye, more readily fades; it has a higher impact resistance, a more rapid moisture absorption, greater elasticity, and elastic recovery.
 Variation of luster: nylon has the ability to be very lustrous, semi-lustrous, or dull.
 Durability: its high tenacity fibers are used for seatbelts, tire cords, ballistic cloth, and other uses.
 High elongation
 Excellent abrasion resistance
 Highly resilient (nylon fabrics are heat-set)
 Paved the way for easy-care garments
 High resistance to insects, fungi, animals, as well as molds, mildew, rot, and many chemicals
 Used in carpets and nylon stockings
 Melts instead of burning
 Used in many military applications
 Good specific strength
 Transparent to infrared light (−12 dB)

Flammability 
Nylon clothing tends to be less flammable than cotton and rayon, but nylon fibers may melt and stick to skin.

Uses of nylon 
Nylon was first used commercially in a nylon-bristled toothbrush in 1938, followed more famously in women's stockings or "nylons" which were shown at the 1939 New York World's Fair and first sold commercially in 1940. Its use increased dramatically during World War II, when the need for fabrics increased dramatically.

Nylon fibers 

Bill Pittendreigh, DuPont, and other individuals and corporations worked diligently during the first few months of World War II to find a way to replace Asian silk and hemp with nylon in parachutes. It was also used to make tires, tents, ropes, ponchos, and other military supplies. It was even used in the production of a high-grade paper for U.S. currency. At the outset of the war, cotton accounted for more than 80% of all fibers used and manufactured, and wool fibers accounted for nearly all of the rest. By August 1945, manufactured fibers had taken a market share of 25%, at the expense of cotton. After the war, because of shortages of both silk and nylon, nylon parachute material was sometimes repurposed to make dresses.

Nylon 6 and 66 fibers are used in carpet manufacture.

Nylon is one kind of fiber used in tire cord. Herman E. Schroeder pioneered application of nylon in tires.

Molds and resins 
Nylon resins are widely used in the automobile industry especially in the engine compartment.

Molded nylon is used in hair combs and mechanical parts such as machine screws, gears, gaskets, and other low- to medium-stress components previously cast in metal. Engineering-grade nylon is processed by extrusion, casting, and injection molding. Type 6,6 Nylon 101 is the most common commercial grade of nylon, and Nylon 6 is the most common commercial grade of molded nylon. For use in tools such as spudgers, nylon is available in glass-filled variants which increase structural and impact strength and rigidity, and molybdenum disulfide-filled variants which increase lubricity. Nylon can be used as the matrix material in composite materials, with reinforcing fibers like glass or carbon fiber; such a composite has a higher density than pure nylon. Such thermoplastic composites (25% to 30% glass fiber) are frequently used in car components next to the engine, such as intake manifolds, where the good heat resistance of such materials makes them feasible competitors to metals.

Nylon was used to make the stock of the Remington Nylon 66 rifle. The frame of the modern Glock pistol is made of a nylon composite.

Food packaging 
Nylon resins are used as a component of food packaging films where an oxygen barrier is needed. Some of the terpolymers based upon nylon are used every day in packaging. Nylon has been used for meat wrappings and sausage sheaths. The high temperature resistance of nylon makes it useful for oven bags.

Filaments 
Nylon filaments are primarily used in brushes especially toothbrushes and string trimmers. They are also used as monofilaments in fishing line. Nylon 610 and 612 are the most used polymers for filaments.

Its various properties also make it very useful as a material in additive manufacturing; specifically as a filament in consumer and professional grade fused deposition modeling 3D printers.

Other forms

Extruded profiles 
Nylon resins can be extruded into rods, tubes, and sheets.

Powder coating 
Nylon powders are used to powder coat metals. Nylon 11 and nylon 12 are the most widely used.

Instrument strings 
In the mid-1940s, classical guitarist Andrés Segovia mentioned the shortage of good guitar strings in the United States, particularly his favorite Pirastro catgut strings, to a number of foreign diplomats at a party, including General Lindeman of the British Embassy. A month later, the General presented Segovia with some nylon strings which he had obtained via some members of the DuPont family. Segovia found that although the strings produced a clear sound, they had a faint metallic timbre which he hoped could be eliminated.

Nylon strings were first tried on stage by Olga Coelho in New York in January 1944.

In 1946, Segovia and string maker Albert Augustine were introduced by their mutual friend Vladimir Bobri, editor of Guitar Review. On the basis of Segovia's interest and Augustine's past experiments, they decided to pursue the development of nylon strings. DuPont, skeptical of the idea, agreed to supply the nylon if Augustine would endeavor to develop and produce the actual strings. After three years of development, Augustine demonstrated a nylon first string whose quality impressed guitarists, including Segovia, in addition to DuPont.

Wound strings, however, were more problematic. Eventually, however, after experimenting with various types of metal and smoothing and polishing techniques, Augustine was also able to produce high quality nylon wound strings.

See also 
 Ballistic nylon
 Cordura
 Forensic engineering
 Nylon-eating bacteria
 Plastic
 Polyamide, PA
 Ripstop nylon
 Step-growth polymerization

Notes

References

Further reading

External links 

 
 Polyamide Nylon Plastic
 Joseph X. Labovsky Collection of Nylon Photographs and Ephemera Science History Institute Digital Collections. (High-resolution scans of nylon-related photographs and ephemera collected by Joseph X. Labovsky, a lab assistant to Wallace Carothers, during the early stages of nylon development and production at DuPont).

Products introduced in 1935
American inventions
Commodity chemicals
Dielectrics
DuPont products
Plastics
Polyamides
Synthetic fibers

de:Polyamide#Nylon